Manchester is a city in Northwest England.  The M3 postcode area of the city includes the western part of the city centre.  The area contains 79 listed buildings that are recorded in the National Heritage List for England.  Of these, five are listed at Grade I, the highest of the three grades, two are at Grade II*, the middle grade, and the others are at Grade II, the lowest grade.

The area contains a large variety of listed buildings.  The oldest two originated as collegiate churches, and one became Manchester Cathedral and the other Chetham's Hospital.  In the late 18th and early 19th centuries, Manchester grew rapidly as a major centre of the Industrial Revolution, and this was stimulated by the development of the canals and the railways.  Parts of the Bridgewater Canal, the Manchester and Salford Junction Canal and the Rochdale Canal pass through the area, and the listed buildings associated with these include a canal basin, a weir, a bridge, locks and a lock keeper's cottage.  The first commercial steam passenger railway terminated in the area at Liverpool Road Railway Station.  The station and associated bridges and viaducts are listed, as are buildings constructed for the transport of goods, and these buildings, together with former market halls, have been converted to become the Manchester Museum of Science and Industry.

The other listed buildings include houses, churches, shops, former warehouses converted for other uses, offices, hotels and public houses, bridges, viaducts, railway stations, a college, a library, a former postal sorting office, a power station converted into part of a museum, a theatre, three electricity junction boxes, and two telephone kiosks.


Key

Buildings

References

Citations

Sources

Lists of listed buildings in Greater Manchester
Buildings and structures in Manchester